Lectionary 337 (Gregory-Aland), designated by siglum ℓ 337 (in the Gregory-Aland numbering) is a Greek manuscript of the New Testament, on parchment. Palaeographically it has been assigned to the 12th-century. The manuscript has not survived in complete condition.

Description 

The original codex contained lessons from the Gospel of John, Matthew and Luke (Evangelistarium) with lacunae on 103 parchment leaves. The leaves are measured.

The text is written in Greek minuscule letters, in two columns per page, 27 lines per page. It has no musical notes.

The codex contains weekday Gospel lessons from Easter to Pentecost and Saturday/Sunday Gospel lessons for the other weeks.

History 

Scrivener dated the manuscript to the 13th-century, Gregory dated it to the 12th or 13th-century. It is presently assigned by the INTF to the 12th-century.

In 1882 H. C. Clements presented it  for the British Museum.

The manuscript was added to the list of New Testament manuscripts by Scrivener (285e) and Gregory (number 337e). Gregory saw it in 1883.

Currently the codex is housed at the British Library (Add MS 31949) in London.

The fragment is not cited in critical editions of the Greek New Testament (UBS4, NA27).

See also 

 List of New Testament lectionaries
 Biblical manuscript
 Textual criticism
 Lectionary 336

References

Bibliography

External links 
 

Greek New Testament lectionaries
12th-century biblical manuscripts
British Library additional manuscripts